Pedro Porras Pérez (born 1 August 1959) is a Mexican politician affiliated with the PRD. As of 2013 he served as Deputy of the LXII Legislature of the Mexican Congress representing the State of Mexico.

References

1959 births
Living people
Politicians from Hidalgo (state)
Party of the Democratic Revolution politicians
21st-century Mexican politicians
Members of the Congress of Hidalgo
Deputies of the LXII Legislature of Mexico
Members of the Chamber of Deputies (Mexico) for the State of Mexico